Lophorrhachia is a genus of moths in the family Geometridae described by Louis Beethoven Prout in 1916.

Species
Lophorrhachia niveicristata Prout, 1916 Natal
Lophorrhachia palliata (Warren, 1898) western Africa

References

Geometridae